IEEE Communications Letters is a peer-reviewed scientific journal published monthly by the IEEE Communications Society since 1997 and covering communications technology. The editor-in-chief is Marco Di Renzo (Laboratory of Signals and Systems Paris-Saclay University CNRS--CentraleSupelec--University Paris-Sud-Paris, France). According to the Journal Citation Reports, it has a 2021 impact factor of 3.457.

References

External links 
 

Communications Letters
Engineering journals
Publications established in 1997
English-language journals
Monthly journals